Military Prosecutor Doberman is a South Korean television series starring Ahn Bo-hyun and Jo Bo-ah. It aired on tvN from February 28 to April 26, 2022, every Monday and Tuesday at 22:30 (KST) for 16 episodes.

Synopsis
Military Prosecutor Doberman tells the story of Do Bae-man (Ahn Bo-hyun), who initially became a military prosecutor for money and fame where he looks forward to his retirement day, as well as Cha Woo-in (Jo Bo-ah), who was born into a chaebol family and who subsequently became a military prosecutor for revenge.

Cast and characters

Main
 Ahn Bo-hyun as Captain Do Bae-man
 A military prosecutor who tried to avoid military service by getting expelled from his high school after the death of his parents in a car accident 20 years ago. Despite that, he is able to graduate and goes on to become a lawyer. However, his job applications are all rejected by multiple law firms due to his low education background. His determination and intelligence catches the attention of a corrupt lawyer called Yong Moon-goo who offers him a job in his law firm on condition that he first work as a military prosecutor for five years. At first he was a very opportunistic individual, as he worked solely for money and willed to seek more profitable opportunities through people around him or Yong Moon-goo, much to the latter's annoyance. However he met a new woman military prosecutor that radically changed his point of view.
 Jo Bo-ah as Captain Cha Woo-in
 A new military prosecutor who is the only daughter of a conglomerate. She presents herself as a by the book military lawyer, but she is actually highly intelligent and skilled in the martial arts, which she tries to reveal to Do Bae-man slowly. She is able to predict most of her adversaries' movements. Sometimes, she disguised herself as "red wig woman" in order to carry revenge to those who wronged others, like Han Se-na. She seeks to use Do Bae-man for her plan to get revenge for the destruction of her father's defense company IM Defense when it is framed for corruption and then acquired at a knockdown price by a client of Yong Moon-goo. The corruption charge led to her father's arrest; he died shortly afterward in a shady car accident that involved Noh Hwa-young.
 Oh Yeon-soo as Major General Noh Hwa-young
 The current owner of IM Defense and also the first female division commander since the founding of the army who beats out competition from a hundred male soldiers who covet her place. She behaves harshly toward her son, Noh Tae-nam, especially when he misbehaves and disgraces her name, and inflicts traumatizing punishment on him, such as asking him to hold a live grenade. However she let her son becomes chairman of IM Defense so that she can fulfil her military career ambition. She is highly corrupted, as she commits profiteering through her ownership in IM Defense and her position in the military. She was also responsible for the death of Bae-man's parents, Woo-in's father's accident and other crimes. She is the main antagonist of the series. She was later exposed for corruption, and sentenced to death for multiple murders and other crimes.
 Kim Young-min as Yong Moon-goo
 A corrupt and short tempered lawyer and former prosecutor from a special division. He gets angry easily if things are not working as planned or when he was felt betrayed (mostly by Do Bae-man's opportunistic behavior). He usually uses coercion and threats against witnesses or manipulates evidences that potentially harm his clients at the court. He works for Commander Noh by keeping her reputation as the highest woman in the military as clean as possible. He also reports to her on Noh Tae-man's misbehavior so she can directly punish him. However behind Noh Hwa-young's back, he wants to own IM Defense for his own. He was later jailed for being Hwa-young's accomplice in her criminal acts.
 Kim Woo-suk as Noh Tae-nam
 Son of Noh Hwa-young and also a third-generation chaebol who becomes the chairman of IM Defense in his late 20s. He also owns a bar named Cartel, where he and a celebrity singer named Allen regularly invite women whom they drug, sexually assault and rape while videotaping them. Even though he acts rude toward other older people (such as Do Bae-man and Yong Moon-goo) and tough when committing crimes, he is deeply frightened of his mother and mandatory military service. Due to relentless bullying while in the military, he slowly matured and realise the error of his ways, as well as his mother's. He was close to his pet dog "Bolt", whom he treated with affection and compassion.

Supporting

People around Do Bae-man
 Kang Mal-geum as Do Soo-kyung 
 Do Bae-man's aunt, who raised Do Bae-man after his parents passed away. She is a veteran homicide detective who, together with Cha Woo-in, helps Han Se-na after she was assaulted by Allen and Noh Tae-man. She later dated Bae-man's superior Joo-hyuk and had a child with him after their marriage.
Kwon Dong-ho as Seo Rak
 CEO of Seorak Cheonji, an illegal gang-related business. He hold grudges against Do Bae-man after his father was sent to prison. However, he and his gang was humiliated by Cha Woo-in.
 Lee Jin-soo as Do Sung-hwan
 Do Bae-man's father, 20 years ago, worked as a military judge in the 58th Army Brigade. He died in a fiery car accident orchestrated by Noh Hwa-young.
 Chae Song-hwa as Yoo Jung-yeon
 Do Bae-man's mother, 20 years ago, worked as a military judge in the 58th Army Brigade. She died in the same car accident.

People around Cha Woo-in
 Kang Young-seok as Kang Ha-joon
 Owner of Kang's Solution, a company in military industry. His company was supported by Cha  Woo-in's father, therefore he helped Cha Woo-in in accomplishing her goal
 Yoo Hye-in as Han Se-na
 A model and a fan of idol singer Allen. She sent an Instagram DM to him and got a response from Allen. She was excited to meet Allen in Noh Tae-nam's nightclub. However her meeting with Tae-nam and Allen was the beginning of her misfortune, that leads to Cha Woo-in setting up revenge upon Allen and his friends in his penthouse.

Patriotic Association member
 Nam Kyung-eup as Minister of Defense Lee Jae-sik
 The leader of the Patriotic Society. He was a 4-Star General who later assumed the post of National Defense Minister.
 Lee Jung-yeon as Hong Moo-seop 
 Commander of the 4th Squadron. An elite who rose to the position after graduating from the sixth grade and passed the bar exam. Among the members of the Patriotic Association, he is the least revealing of himself. He has been faithful to Lee Jae-sik for a long time, but his position is being narrowed by being obscured by Noh Hwa-young. He pretends to be generous on the outside, but if he catches Noh Hwa-young's weakness at any time, he is determine to target her weakness. He was also involved in assaulting his assistants and lower-ranked recruits, both physically and sexually. Bae-man successfully prosecutes him for these allegations and allowed Moo-seop to serve a three-year term of imprisonment for his crimes.
 Lim Cheol-hyung as Won Ki-chun 
 Commander of the 4th Battalion Search Battalion and the youngest member of the Patriotic Association, a secret organization in the army in which Noh Noh-young was the first female corps commander. He was initially thought to have heroically saved a recruit at a minefield and lost a leg, but it was revealed he intentionally shot the recruit and his leg was deliberately amputated by Noh Hwa-young as part of his facade in order for him to be a politician after his retirement. He was later killed by Hwa-young upon the exposure of his facade.

People around Noh Hwa-young
 Jo Hye-won as Yang Jong-sook
 Noh Hwa-young assistant. She was sexually assaulted by Hong Moo-seop in the past, and unlike Hwa-young, she was morally-conflicted by her and Hwa-young's immoral acts.

Military Law Office People
 Lee Tae-hyung as Yeom Sang-jin
 A veteran investigator from the 58th Division's Military Law Office. He used to work for Bae-man's parents and was the investigator in charge of the investigation of the accident that killed Bae-man's parents 20 years ago.

Military Law Office, 4th Infantry Division
 Park Jin-woo as Seo Joo-hyuk 
 Legal advisor with authority in the 4th Infantry Division Military Law Office, he was the direct superior of Do Bae-man and Cha Woo-in, the highest rank in the military law firm. He later dated Bae-man's aunt and became her husband.
 Go Geon-han as Yoon Sang-gi
 A military investigator in the Military Law Office and loyal assistant of Do Bae-man, who has excellent computer use and driving skills.
 Kim Han-na as Ahn Yu-ra
 An investigator and Cha Woo-in's assistant.

Others
 Park Sang-nam as Allen
 A handsome idol singer and Noh Tae-nam's close friend. Both of them often hangs out in Cartel and commits gross misdeeds toward women they invite. One of his victims was his own fan Han Se-na, who asks Cha Woo-in for help.  Cha Woo-in confronts and then kidnaps him and his friends in his penthouse.
 Ryu Seong-rok as Ahn Soo-ho 
 A Sergeant Major, he is the son of the president of Gusan Bank. He is double faced and pretends to be "good guy" when he has actually committed murder in the past during his school days. Out of revenge due to Bae-man arresting him, he met up with Seo Rak and asked him to help kill Bae-man. Later, Bae-man instigates him to bully Tae-nam by pointing that the real culprit responsible for his conviction was Tae-nam. Soo-ho later became one of the deceased victims of the military camp mass shooting case.
 Kim Byung-chun as Military judge
 Kim Yo-han as Pyun Sang-Ho
 An obese but friendly recruit who befriends Tae-nam, and was the only person in the army who treats Tae-nam with kindness and compassion. However, due to excessive bullying and sexual abuse by the other recruits, Sang-ho went berserk and causes a mass shooting case, which killed thirteen people, and he was sentenced to death by the military court; the surviving bullies were subsequently punished for their wrongdoings as well.

Special appearance
 Baek Hyun-joo as Hong Kyung-ok 
 The younger sister of the corps commander Hong Mu-seop.
 Nam Mi-jung as Ms. Paeng (Ep. 4-6)

Production 
On January 25, 2022, photos from the first script reading were published.

Original soundtrack

Part 1

Part 2

Part 3

Part 4

Part 5

Viewership

References

External links
  
 
 
 

TVN (South Korean TV channel) television dramas
Korean-language television shows
South Korean legal television series
South Korean military television series
Television series by Studio Dragon
Television series by Logos Film
2022 South Korean television series debuts
2022 South Korean television series endings
Television series about prosecutors